Ophiogomphus mainensis, the Maine snaketail, is a species of clubtail in the family of dragonflies known as Gomphidae. It is found in North America.

The IUCN conservation status of Ophiogomphus mainensis is "LC", least concern, with no immediate threat to the species' survival. The population is stable.

Subspecies
These two subspecies belong to the species Ophiogomphus mainensis:
 Ophiogomphus mainensis fastigiatus Donnelly, 1987 i c g
 Ophiogomphus mainensis mainensis Packard, 1863 i g
Data sources: i = ITIS, c = Catalogue of Life, g = GBIF, b = Bugguide.net

References

Further reading

 

Ophiogomphus
Articles created by Qbugbot
Insects described in 1863